Tisca Tiara is a textile company based in Bühler in Switzerland. They make textile floor coverings, curtains, upholstery, decorative fabrics and Artificial turf for sports use.

In February 2015 Arsenal F.C. ordered 1,400 m2 of artificial grass from them for their training pitch at the Arsenal Training Centre.

References

Artificial turf